Love Out Loud is the sixth studio album by Jaci Velasquez, released on March 18, 2008.

Album background
On the heels of the tenth anniversary celebration of her debut platinum selling album, Heavenly Place, Velasquez returned to the studio to write and record Love Out Loud. Velasquez once again teamed-up with Mark Heimermann, the producer of her first three albums. The lead single is "Love Out Loud" that speaks of putting one's words into action to show others God's love through us.

Track listing 
 "Nothing But Sky" – 3:25 (written by Madeline Stone and Dennis Matkosky)
 "It's Not You It's Me" – 3:53 (written by Jaci Velasquez, Tony Lucido and John Glover)
 "Love Out Loud" – 4:07 (written by Jaci Velasquez, Mark Heimermann and Judson Spence)
 "Jesus (The Way)" – 3:33 (written by John Glover)
 "My Alleluia (When Words Fail)" – 3:43 (written by Mark Heimermann and Kyle Matthews)
 "Weightless" – 4:26 (written by Mark Heimermann)
 "Likely Story" – 4:01 (written by Jaci Velasquez and Mark Heimermann)
 "Tango" – 3:02 (written by Jaci Velasquez and Mark Heimermann)
 "Por Escrito " – 3:00 written by (Jaci Velasquez and Alexis Puentes)
 "Into the Light Again" – 3:48 (written by Jaci Velasquez, Mark Heimermann and Heather Garborg)
 "Nothing But Sky (Outro)" – 1:03
 "Love Out Loud" (acoustic demo version) iTunes pre-order bonus track (written by Jaci Velasquez, Mark Heimermann and Judson Spence)

Personnel 
 Jaci Velasquez – vocals, backing vocals 
 Mark Heimermann – keyboards, acoustic piano, programming, backing vocals 
 Jerry McPherson – guitars 
 Michael Ripoll – guitars 
 Justin York – guitars 
 Brent Milligan – bass 
 Akil Thompson – bass 
 Dan Needham – drums 
 Javier Solis – percussion 
 Nic Gonzales – vocals 

String Section
 Mark Heimermann – arrangements 
 David Davidson – arrangements 
 David Angell, Monisa Angell, John Catchings, Bruce Christensen, David Davidson, Conni Ellisor, Jim Grosjean, Anthony LaMarchina, Bob Mason, Pamela Sixfin, Elizabeth Stewart, Julie Tanner and Karen Winklemann – string players

Choir
 Amy Delaine, Jan Harris, Chris Wise and Joy Wise

Production 
 Mark Heimermann – producer, engineer 
 Michael Modesto – engineer 
 Glenn Spinner – engineer 
 Steve MacMillan – mixing 
 PJ Heimermann – production coordinator 
 Kristin Barlowe – photography

Charts

References 

2008 albums
Jaci Velasquez albums